Investment incentive is a government-implemented incentive policy aimed to encourage investors into its domestic market or to promote expansion of existing businesses. Investment incentives encompass creating an environment that enables foreign businesses to operate profitably and decreases risks. They are widely used by developing countries to attract investments. The incentives take form of "direct subsidies (investment grants) or corporate income tax credits (investment credit) that compensates the investors for their capital costs".

Scholars generally consider economic development incentives to be inefficient, economically costly, and distortionary.

See also
 Foreign direct investment
 List of countries by FDI abroad
 List of countries by received FDI
 Investment promotion agency

Further reading 

 Jensen, N., & Malesky, E. (2018). Incentives to Pander: How Politicians Use Corporate Welfare for Political Gain. Cambridge: Cambridge University Press.

References 

Financial markets
Foreign direct investment
International macroeconomics